Sam Handley (born 7 October 1995) is an English cricketer measuring at 5”5 and is known as the Short King. He made his first-class debut on 7 April 2018 for Cambridge MCCU against Essex as part of the Marylebone Cricket Club University fixtures.

References

External links
 

1995 births
Living people
English cricketers
Cambridge MCCU cricketers